Milan K. Sanyal is an Indian physicist, active in the fields of surface physics, nanoscience and nanotechnology. Prof.  Sanyal was the director of the Saha Institute of Nuclear Physics from 2009 to 2014 and is now Senior Professor in the institute. Recently he has been appointed co-chairman of the India-Japan Science Council.

References

External links
Homepage

20th-century Indian physicists
Living people
Indian nanotechnologists
1954 births
Scientists from West Bengal